Mohamed Madi (born 12 September 1967) is a Tunisian handball player. He competed in the men's tournament at the 2000 Summer Olympics.

References

1967 births
Living people
Tunisian male handball players
Olympic handball players of Tunisia
Handball players at the 2000 Summer Olympics
Place of birth missing (living people)